The Pervouralsk constituency (No.173) is a Russian legislative constituency in Sverdlovsk Oblast. The constituency covers southewestern Sverdlovsk Oblast.

Members elected

Election results

1993

|-
! colspan=2 style="background-color:#E9E9E9;text-align:left;vertical-align:top;" |Candidate
! style="background-color:#E9E9E9;text-align:left;vertical-align:top;" |Party
! style="background-color:#E9E9E9;text-align:right;" |Votes
! style="background-color:#E9E9E9;text-align:right;" |%
|-
|style="background-color:"|
|align=left|Leonid Nekrasov
|align=left|Independent
|
|26.33%
|-
|style="background-color:"|
|align=left|Mikhail Ananyin
|align=left|Independent
| -
|18.74%
|-
| colspan="5" style="background-color:#E9E9E9;"|
|- style="font-weight:bold"
| colspan="3" style="text-align:left;" | Total
| 
| 100%
|-
| colspan="5" style="background-color:#E9E9E9;"|
|- style="font-weight:bold"
| colspan="4" |Source:
|
|}

1995

|-
! colspan=2 style="background-color:#E9E9E9;text-align:left;vertical-align:top;" |Candidate
! style="background-color:#E9E9E9;text-align:left;vertical-align:top;" |Party
! style="background-color:#E9E9E9;text-align:right;" |Votes
! style="background-color:#E9E9E9;text-align:right;" |%
|-
|style="background-color:"|
|align=left|Gennady Burbulis
|align=left|Independent
|
|19.41%
|-
|style="background-color:#D50000"|
|align=left|Boris Yachmenev
|align=left|Communists and Working Russia - for the Soviet Union
|
|16.45%
|-
|style="background-color:#295EC4"|
|align=left|Leonid Nekrasov (incumbent)
|align=left|Party of Economic Freedom
|
|13.18%
|-
|style="background-color:"|
|align=left|Vera Sokolkina
|align=left|Independent
|
|10.44%
|-
|style="background-color:"|
|align=left|Valery Melekhin
|align=left|Independent
|
|9.79%
|-
|style="background-color:#DA2021"|
|align=left|Yelena Zvereva
|align=left|Ivan Rybkin Bloc
|
|6.91%
|-
|style="background-color:"|
|align=left|Sergey Kamelin
|align=left|Liberal Democratic Party
|
|5.65%
|-
|style="background-color:"|
|align=left|Vladimir Prisyazhny
|align=left|Independent
|
|3.18%
|-
|style="background-color:#000000"|
|colspan=2 |against all
|
|12.82%
|-
| colspan="5" style="background-color:#E9E9E9;"|
|- style="font-weight:bold"
| colspan="3" style="text-align:left;" | Total
| 
| 100%
|-
| colspan="5" style="background-color:#E9E9E9;"|
|- style="font-weight:bold"
| colspan="4" |Source:
|
|}

1999

|-
! colspan=2 style="background-color:#E9E9E9;text-align:left;vertical-align:top;" |Candidate
! style="background-color:#E9E9E9;text-align:left;vertical-align:top;" |Party
! style="background-color:#E9E9E9;text-align:right;" |Votes
! style="background-color:#E9E9E9;text-align:right;" |%
|-
|style="background-color:"|
|align=left|Zelimkhan Mutsoyev
|align=left|Independent
|
|21.58%
|-
|style="background-color:"|
|align=left|Vladimir Primakov
|align=left|Independent
|
|20.35%
|-
|style="background-color:"|
|align=left|Odis Gaisin
|align=left|Independent
|
|10.68%
|-
|style="background-color:#D50000"|
|align=left|Boris Yachmenev
|align=left|Communists and Workers of Russia - for the Soviet Union
|
|10.51%
|-
|style="background-color:#C21022"|
|align=left|Sergey Zapolsky
|align=left|Party of Pensioners
|
|8.47%
|-
|style="background-color:"|
|align=left|Valery Melekhin
|align=left|Independent
|
|2.88%
|-
|style="background-color:"|
|align=left|Sergey Yakimov
|align=left|Congress of Russian Communities-Yury Boldyrev Movement
|
|2.79%
|-
|style="background-color:"|
|align=left|Aleksandr Ivanchin-Pisarev
|align=left|Independent
|
|2.31%
|-
|style="background-color:"|
|align=left|Nikolay Arzhannikov
|align=left|Independent
|
|1.64%
|-
|style="background-color:"|
|align=left|Sergey Semenyuk
|align=left|Independent
|
|1.60%
|-
|style="background-color:#000000"|
|colspan=2 |against all
|
|14.85%
|-
| colspan="5" style="background-color:#E9E9E9;"|
|- style="font-weight:bold"
| colspan="3" style="text-align:left;" | Total
| 
| 100%
|-
| colspan="5" style="background-color:#E9E9E9;"|
|- style="font-weight:bold"
| colspan="4" |Source:
|
|}

2003

|-
! colspan=2 style="background-color:#E9E9E9;text-align:left;vertical-align:top;" |Candidate
! style="background-color:#E9E9E9;text-align:left;vertical-align:top;" |Party
! style="background-color:#E9E9E9;text-align:right;" |Votes
! style="background-color:#E9E9E9;text-align:right;" |%
|-
|style="background-color:#FFD700"|
|align=left|Zelimkhan Mutsoyev (incumbent)
|align=left|People's Party
|
|55.83%
|-
|style="background-color:"|
|align=left|Dmitry Ostanin
|align=left|Agrarian Party
|
|7.65%
|-
|style="background-color:"|
|align=left|Pyotr Zheleznyak
|align=left|Communist Party
|
|7.08%
|-
|style="background-color:"|
|align=left|Aleksandr Novikov
|align=left|Liberal Democratic Party
|
|4.42%
|-
|style="background-color:"|
|align=left|Vladimir Dmitriyev
|align=left|Independent
|
|3.02%
|-
|style="background-color:"|
|align=left|Dmitry Chekashev
|align=left|Independent
|
|2.66%
|-
|style="background-color:"|
|align=left|Andrey Dorozhkin
|align=left|Independent
|
|0.98%
|-
|style="background-color:#000000"|
|colspan=2 |against all
|
|16.70%
|-
| colspan="5" style="background-color:#E9E9E9;"|
|- style="font-weight:bold"
| colspan="3" style="text-align:left;" | Total
| 
| 100%
|-
| colspan="5" style="background-color:#E9E9E9;"|
|- style="font-weight:bold"
| colspan="4" |Source:
|
|}

2016

|-
! colspan=2 style="background-color:#E9E9E9;text-align:left;vertical-align:top;" |Candidate
! style="background-color:#E9E9E9;text-align:leftt;vertical-align:top;" |Party
! style="background-color:#E9E9E9;text-align:right;" |Votes
! style="background-color:#E9E9E9;text-align:right;" |%
|-
| style="background-color: " |
|align=left|Zelimkhan Mutsoyev
|align=left|United Russia
|
|47.00%
|-
| style="background-color: " |
|align=left|Vladislav Punin
|align=left|A Just Russia
|
|14.30%
|-
|style="background-color:"|
|align=left|Nikolay Yezersky
|align=left|Communist Party
|
|12.69%
|-
|style="background-color:"|
|align=left|Anton Bezdenezhnykh
|align=left|Liberal Democratic Party
|
|11.07%
|-
|style="background-color: " |
|align=left|Aleksey Poletayev
|align=left|Communists of Russia
|
|3.03%
|-
|style="background-color: " |
|align=left|Aleksandr Cherkasov
|align=left|The Greens
|
|1.90%
|-
|style="background-color:"|
|align=left|Igor Konakov
|align=left|People's Freedom Party
|
|1.78%
|-
|style="background-color:"|
|align=left|Sergey Yarutin
|align=left|Patriots of Russia
|
|1.59%
|-
|style="background-color:"|
|align=left|Sergey Renzhin
|align=left|Party of Growth
|
|1.40%
|-
| colspan="5" style="background-color:#E9E9E9;"|
|- style="font-weight:bold"
| colspan="3" style="text-align:left;" | Total
| 
| 100%
|-
| colspan="5" style="background-color:#E9E9E9;"|
|- style="font-weight:bold"
| colspan="4" |Source:
|
|}

2021

|-
! colspan=2 style="background-color:#E9E9E9;text-align:left;vertical-align:top;" |Candidate
! style="background-color:#E9E9E9;text-align:left;vertical-align:top;" |Party
! style="background-color:#E9E9E9;text-align:right;" |Votes
! style="background-color:#E9E9E9;text-align:right;" |%
|-
|style="background-color: " |
|align=left|Zelimkhan Mutsoyev (incumbent)
|align=left|United Russia
|
|37.77%
|-
|style="background-color:"|
|align=left|Taras Isakov
|align=left|Communist Party
|
|24.56%
|-
|style="background-color:"|
|align=left|Nikolay Samutin
|align=left|A Just Russia — For Truth
|
|11.88%
|-
|style="background-color:"|
|align=left|Aleksandr Panasenko
|align=left|Liberal Democratic Party
|
|9.47%
|-
|style="background-color:"|
|align=left|Nikolay Aleksandrov
|align=left|Rodina
|
|7.20%
|-
|style="background-color: " |
|align=left|Aleksandr Kudelkin
|align=left|Yabloko
|
|2.98%
|-
| colspan="5" style="background-color:#E9E9E9;"|
|- style="font-weight:bold"
| colspan="3" style="text-align:left;" | Total
| 
| 100%
|-
| colspan="5" style="background-color:#E9E9E9;"|
|- style="font-weight:bold"
| colspan="4" |Source:
|
|}

Notes

References

Russian legislative constituencies
Politics of Sverdlovsk Oblast